Ivan "Beli" Krstić (Serbian Cyrillic: Иван Бели Крстић; 30 June 1980 – 29 May 2000) was a Serbian footballer who played for FK Radnički Niš.

He started playing with the club at the age of 9, and later joined the first team and became captain. He played with Radnički during the 1999–2000 First League of FR Yugoslavia. He also represented the Yugoslavia U21 national team.

On 29 May 2000 he was struck by lightning whilst training, and was killed instantly. He was 19 years old. In his honour, the youth academy of Radnički Niš is named after him and his shirt number of 10 has been retired by the club.

References 

1980 births
2000 deaths
Serbian footballers
FK Radnički Niš players
Association football midfielders
Deaths from lightning strikes
Association football players who died while playing
Accidental deaths in Serbia